Nokonoko has multiple meanings, including

The Japanese name for the Mario series enemy, Koopa Troopa
A kind of tree found in Fiji
A district of Fiji located in the Ra Province
A word in the Bube language to mean monster, spirit, or evil spirit